Blepharomastix paracausta is a moth in the family Crambidae. It is found on the Solomon Islands.

References

Moths described in 1934
Blepharomastix